Ashton Club Ground was a cricket ground in Ashton-under-Lyne, Lancashire. The first recorded match on the ground was in 1863, when Ashton-under-Lyne played All-England Eleven.

In 1865, the ground acted as a neutral venue when it held its only first-class match between Cambridgeshire and Yorkshire, with the match ending in a draw.

References

External links
Ashton Club Ground on CricketArchive
Ashton Club Ground on Cricinfo

Defunct cricket grounds in England
Buildings and structures in Ashton-under-Lyne
Sport in Tameside
Cricket grounds in Greater Manchester
Defunct sports venues in Greater Manchester
Sports venues completed in 1863